Howl Howl Gaff Gaff is the debut full length album from Swedish band Shout Out Louds. The original version released in Scandinavian countries on 1 October 2003 contained a slightly different track listing from the international release.  Their website advertises the international version as being "A collection of songs from all our Scandinavian releases. Everything from plastic to vinyl."

The international version was released on 24 May 2005 in the United States and Canada. Followed by the releases in Japan on 13 June 2005 and the rest of the World in September 2005.

Track listing

Scandinavian release (2003)

International release (2005)

Singles
"Very Loud" (Vinyl only)
"Shut Your Eyes"
"Very Loud" (CD reissue)
"The Comeback"
"Please Please Please"

Release details

References

2003 debut albums
2005 albums
Shout Out Louds albums